Brachypnoea margaretae is a species of leaf beetle. It is found in North America.

The species was first described by William T. Schultz, who named it after his wife, Margaret.

References

Further reading

 

Eumolpinae
Articles created by Qbugbot
Beetles described in 1980
Beetles of North America